This is a list of Roman governors of Moesia, located where the modern states of Bulgaria and Romania (Dobruja) currently are. In AD 86 this province was divided in to Moesia Superior and Moesia Inferior by the Emperor Domitian in AD 86.

See also 
 List of Roman governors of Lower Moesia
 List of Roman governors of Upper Moesia

References 

 
Moesia